Lists of Heroes of the Soviet Union cover people or groups of people who were given the Hero of the Soviet Union award, the highest distinction in the Soviet Union, for heroic feats in service to the Soviet state and society.
The lists are organized alphabetically, by nationality or ethnicity, and by other criteria.

Alphabetical 
 List of Heroes of the Soviet Union (A)
 List of Heroes of the Soviet Union (B)
 List of Heroes of the Soviet Union (C)
 List of Heroes of the Soviet Union (D)
 List of Heroes of the Soviet Union (F)
 List of Heroes of the Soviet Union (G)
 List of Heroes of the Soviet Union (H)
 List of Heroes of the Soviet Union (I)
 List of Heroes of the Soviet Union (K)
 List of Heroes of the Soviet Union (L)
 List of Heroes of the Soviet Union (M)
 List of Heroes of the Soviet Union (N)
 List of Heroes of the Soviet Union (O)
 List of Heroes of the Soviet Union (P)
 List of Heroes of the Soviet Union (R)
 List of Heroes of the Soviet Union (S)
 List of Heroes of the Soviet Union (T)
 List of Heroes of the Soviet Union (U)
 List of Heroes of the Soviet Union (V)
 List of Heroes of the Soviet Union (Y)
 List of Heroes of the Soviet Union (Z)

Nationality / Ethnicity 
 List of Armenian Heroes of the Soviet Union
 List of Azerbaijani Heroes of the Soviet Union
 List of Bashkir Heroes of the Soviet Union
 List of Baltic Heroes of the Soviet Union
 List of North Caucasian Heroes of the Soviet Union
 List of Georgian Heroes of the Soviet Union
 List of Kazakh Heroes of the Soviet Union
 List of Kyrgyz Heroes of the Soviet Union
List of Moldovan Heroes of the Soviet Union
 List of Tajik Heroes of the Soviet Union
 List of Uzbek Heroes of the Soviet Union
 List of foreign Heroes of the Soviet Union
 List of Heroes of the Soviet Union of repressed ethnicities

Other 
 List of twice Heroes of the Soviet Union
 List of Hero of the Soviet Union forfeitures
 List of female Heroes of the Soviet Union
 List of Jewish Heroes of the Soviet Union